Vladimir Mikhailovich Sobolev (1924 in Kuybyshev, Novosibirsk Oblast – 23 June 2010 in Moscow) was a Soviet diplomat who worked in the embassy to Algeria and served as the Soviet Ambassador to Belgium and to Finland.

References

1924 births
2010 deaths
People from Kuybyshev, Novosibirsk Oblast
Communist Party of the Soviet Union members
Ambassadors of the Soviet Union to Belgium
Ambassadors of the Soviet Union to Finland
Recipients of the Order of the Red Banner
Recipients of the Order of Friendship of Peoples